Cnephasitis spinata is a species of moth of the family Tortricidae. It is found in Tibet, China.

References

Moths described in 1986
Polyorthini